The Columbus Public Library in Columbus, Nebraska, served the city from a  building opened as a library in 1977 through February 2021. In spring 2021, the library relocated temporarily to the former police station at 2419 14th Street during the construction of a new building.

The library was preceded by the Columbus Carnegie Library, designed by local architect Charles Wurdeman, built during 1913-15. It was funded by a $13,000 grant from the Carnegie Foundation. The Carnegie library building, at 1470 25th Avenue, was expanded and renovated while serving as the library.

In 2019, voters approved the development and construction of the Community Building Project.  The Community Building Project consists of the construction of a three-story building housing the Public Library, Columbus Area Arts Council, Columbus Area Children’s Museum, and City Hall.  The site is the former locations of the fire department, senior center, and library which is on the north side of 14th Street east of 26th Avenue.

 First floor will consist of a main front entry point with access to the library, children’s museum, and water utility office.
 Second floor will consist of the extensions of the library and children’s museum and art gallery space.
 Third floor will consist of the community room, council chambers, and city hall.
 The site includes drop off windows to pay city hall bills, library book return, and a privately owned and operated coffee shop.  In addition, the project includes an adjacent parking lot and playground area.

The building is scheduled for occupancy in spring 2023 upon which the existing city hall building will be demolished and the adjacent parking lot and amenities will be completed.

See also
List of Carnegie libraries in Nebraska

References

Libraries in Nebraska
Platte County, Nebraska